The Haaksbergen monster truck accident happened on 28 September 2014 in Haaksbergen, the Netherlands, when a monster truck crashed into the attending crowd. Three visitors were reported dead, amongst them one child. According to Hans Gerritsen, the mayor of Haaksbergen, twelve people were injured.

Accident
The Monster Truck Racing Association has stated that spectators were situated at event level and in close proximity to the performance area, separated by only bike rack barricades. It also stated that multiple layers of safety precaution, such as an on-board Remote Ignition Interrupter (RII) to allow event staff to instantly disable the vehicle, would have undoubtedly prevented the accident.

See also
2014 in the Netherlands

References

External links

2014 in the Netherlands
2014 road incidents in Europe
Haaksbergen
History of Overijssel
Road incidents in the Netherlands
September 2014 events in Europe
Twente
Trucks